Le Cateau is a railway station serving the town Le Cateau-Cambrésis, Nord department, northern France. It is situated on the Creil–Jeumont railway. It was used as a de-training point during the First World War.

The station is served by regional trains to Paris, Saint-Quentin and Maubeuge.

References

Railway stations in Nord (French department)
Railway stations in France opened in 1855